October Storm may refer to:
 Great storm of 1987, or the Great October Storm, which struck the United Kingdom and France
 Lake Storm Aphid, which in October 2006 struck Buffalo, New York, and surrounding areas

See also 
 St. Jude storm, sometimes called the Oktoberstormen 2013 (October Storm 2013) in Danish
 Typhoon Songda (2016), the "Ides of October Storm"